Synergini is a tribe of gall wasps in the subfamily Cynipinae.

Genera 
The following genera are generally accepted within Synergini:

 Agastoroxenia
 Lithosaphonecrus
 Saphonecrus 
 Rhoophilus
 Synergus 
 Ufo

All of these except Lithosaphonecrus and Rhoophilus are found in the eastern Palearctic realm. Synergus has the greatest number of species in Synergini.

A reworking of the entire Cynipidae family published in 2015 transferred three genera formerly included in Synergini to other tribes -  Ceroptres to a tribe of its own (Ceroptresini), and Periclistus and Synophromorpha to Diastrophini.

Gall use 
Members of Synergini have lost the ability to create their own galls, and instead make use of galls left behind by other wasps. As a result, they are classified as inquilines. Species in Synergini usually make use of galls made by wasps in tribe Cynipini.

References 

Cynipidae
Hymenoptera tribes